"Scarecrow" is a song by American singer-songwriter Melissa Etheridge from her sixth studio album Breakdown (1999). It was released as a single from the album in 1999, by Island Records. Etheridge is credited as the sole writer of the song, while production was helmed by Etheridge and John Shanks. The song is dedicated in memory  of Matthew Shepard.

Content 
This ballad tells the story of the kidnapping, torture, and homicide of 21-year-old University of Wyoming student Matthew Shepard, motivated by anti-gay sentiment. The image of a scarecrow was chosen because the bicyclist who found Matthew Shepard, tied to a fence, first thought that he was a scarecrow. The song criticizes hypocritical and deprecatory attitudes towards gay people in media and society.

Composition

According to the sheet music published at Musicnotes.com by Alfred Publishing, the song is written in the key of C major and is set in time signature of common time with a tempo of 88 beats per minute. Etheridge's vocal range spans one octave, from G4 to A5.

Background 
Etheridge was actually supposed to write a theme song for the US women's soccer team when the news about Matthew Shepard reached the headlines. In her autobiography The Truth Is... she tells that it was "Like somebody just dropped a huge brick in her kitchen" as she realized that being a big gay rock star did not help her changing the world. This led her to supporting some of her friends including Ellen DeGeneres who organized a trip to the Denver hospital. Etheridge also states that Shepherd's death made her especially sad since he looked like a gay friend of hers in high school which made her "cry uncontrollably".

Credits and personnel
Credits and personnel are adapted from the Breakdown album liner notes.
 Melissa Etheridge – writer, vocals, acoustic guitar, fuzz guitar, producer
 John Shanks – guitars, producer
 Mark Browne – bass
 Patrick Warren – keyboards
 Kenny Aronoff – drums, shaker
 Chris Lord-Alge – mixing
 Neal Avron – engineer
 Geoff Walcha – assistant engineer
 Bob Ludwig – mastering

Literature 
Melissa Etheridge and Laura Morton: The truth is...', Random House 2002

References

External links
Animated interpretation of "Scarecrow" by Karen J. Siugzda

1999 singles
Melissa Etheridge songs
Works about Matthew Shepard
Songs written by Melissa Etheridge
1999 songs
LGBT-related songs
Song recordings produced by John Shanks
Island Records singles